Kasturibai Nagar or Kasturba Nagar is a railway station on the Chennai MRTS. Located near the Madhya Kailash junction on Rajiv Gandhi Salai, it exclusively serves the Chennai MRTS.

History
Kasturiba Nagar station was opened on 26 January 2004, as part of the second phase of the Chennai MRTS network. The station was built by Larsen & Toubro.

Structure
The elevated station is built on the western banks of Buckingham Canal. The length of the platform is 280 m. The station building consists of 3,200 sq m of parking area in its basement.

Service and connections
Kasturiba Nagar station is the twelfth station on the MRTS line to Velachery. In the return direction from Velachery, it is currently the sixth station towards Chennai Beach station.

See also
 Chennai MRTS
 Chennai suburban railway
 Chennai Metro
 Transport in Chennai

References

Chennai Mass Rapid Transit System stations
Railway stations in Chennai
Railway stations opened in 2004
Memorials to Kasturba Gandhi